The Drastics are a roots-oriented dub reggae group hailing from Chicago.  Though primarily classified as a reggae group, The Drastics embrace many styles of music both live and in the studio.  This can be heard in their songs which draw from  roots reggae, hip hop, jazz (mostly hard-bop), afro-beat, dancehall, as well as folk musics from Asia, Africa, the Middle East and South America.

Band history 

The Drastics formed in December 2003, playing their first show in March 2004 at Chicago's now defunct Fireside Bowl. Answering a Chicago Reader ad placed by guitarist Josh Rosenstock, the original 6 piece lineup formed and began playing originals and a handful of covers.  Over the years, the group has changed from the original lineup.  

The Drastics first full-length album, Premonition was released on Chicago's JumpUp! Records.  The album featured guest vocalists Craig Akira Fujita (Pressure Cooker, Joint Chiefs, 10 ft Ganja Plant), King Django (Stubborn All-Stars), Dr. Ring Ding (Senior All-Stars) as well as several local underground talents.

Their second release, Chicago Massive, is a 2 disc album with 27 tracks and 24 guest musicians.  Disc one is a strictly instrumental set while disc two features 12 different vocalists over 12 tracks.  Guest vocalists include King Django, Dr. Ring Ding, Fada Dougou, MC Zulu, Dayna Lynn, Todd Hembrook (Deal's Gone Bad), and Corey Dixon (formerly of The Zvooks).  Guest musicians on the first disc include reeds player Charles Gorzynski (Salamander, Video Gum Culture), beat makers Heavy Rotation, and trumpeter  Rich Graiko (Westbound Train). The record went into production almost immediately following the release of Premonition and was completed over the course of the next 14 months.  

Though primarily (and originally strictly) instrumental, The Drastics have begun to perform more frequently with vocalists.  Currently, West African vocalist Fada Dougou can be seen regularly bringing his unique style of chant/singing to The Drastic's live shows. Panamanian-born, Chicago-based vocalist Zulu is also a regular performer with the Drastics.

Lineup 
 Tom Riley - Tenor Sax, Flute, Live Dub
 Andrew Zelm - Trombone, Melodica
 Elliot Ross - Guitar
 Brian Citro - Guitar
 Bijan Warner - Keys
 Chris Merrill - Bass
 General Jah Son - Binghi
 Anthony Abbinanti - Drums & Album Engineering/Production
 MC Zulu - Vocals
 Fada Dougou - Vocals

External links 
 
 Official MySpace profile
 Interview with Centerstage Chicago (May 2006)

Dub musical groups